Felice Montagnini (1902–1966) was an Italian conductor and composer of film scores.

Selected filmography
 The Charmer (1931)
 The Man with the Claw (1931)
 The Paw (1931)
 Unripe Fruit (1934
 I Don't Know You Anymore(1936)
 The Carnival Is Here Again (1937)
 Dora Nelson (1939)
 Two Million for a Smile (1939)
 Then We'll Get a Divorce (1940)
 The Secret Lover (1941)
 Happy Days (1942)
 The Taming of the Shrew (1942)
 Without a Woman (1943)
 Come Back to Sorrento (1945)
 Mad About Opera (1948)
 Eleven Men and a Ball (1948)
 The Emperor of Capri (1949)
 The Merry Widower (1950)
 My Beautiful Daughter (1950)
 Soho Conspiracy (1950)
 I'm the Capataz (1951)
 Toto in Color (1952)
 Husbands in the City (1957)
 Son of the Circus (1963)

References

Bibliography
 Mancini, Elaine. Struggles of the Italian film industry during fascism, 1930-1935. UMI Research Press, 1985.

External links

1902 births
1966 deaths
20th-century Italian composers
Musicians from Turin